Nargis Rabadi (24 April 1929 – 6 March 2018), better known by her stage name Shammi, was an Indian actress who appeared in over two hundred Hindi films. Shammi remained a sought-after actress with filmmakers when it came to goofy and comic roles, especially in the period 1949–1969 and later from 1980–2002. Her famous films as supporting actress included Dil Apna Aur Preet Parai, Half Ticket, Halaku, Samaj Ko Badal Dalo, Khuda Gawah, Coolie No. 1, Gopi Kishan and Hum Saath Saath Hain and films with Rajesh Khanna like The Train, Aanchal, Kudrat, Red Rose,  Awara Baap and Swarg. She had been a leading actress playing main female lead or second female lead in Hindi films between 1949–1955 as well. Later, from 1986 till 1998, she appeared in many popular television serials such as Dekh Bhai Dekh, Zabaan Sambhal Ke, Shriman Shrimati, Kabhi Yeh Kabhi Woh and Filmi Chakkar. Shammi is the younger sister of fashion designer Mani Rabadi.

Early life
Rabadi was born in 1929 in Bombay, India. Her father was a priest in an agyari (Parsi fire temple) and died when she was around three years old. After her father's death, her mother used to cook food at all the religious functions organized by the Parsi community to earn money. Rabadi had an elder sister Mani Rabadi, who was a fashion designer and worked extensively with many actresses as their dress designer in Hindi films between 1967 and 1994. Her mother's younger sister lived with her. They stayed in Tata Blocks in Parel, South Mumbai in 1930–47 period. Her sister joined Johnson and Johnson as a secretary after completing her secondary school education.

In 1942, Johnson and Johnson manufactured tablets and Rabadi was employed in the packing department. Her job was to collect the tablets that were not sealed in the tablet case, and had fallen off from the machine. She had to put them into big bottles which would go to hospitals for free distribution to patients. She was paid Rs 100 per month for doing this job.

Career 

Shammi got into films by chance. A family friend was very friendly with actor and producer Sheikh Mukhtar. At that time, Mukhtar was looking for an actress for the second lead, in a film he was to start with Begum Para as the main female lead. He got her to meet Sheikh Mukhtar. Mukhtar was concerned about her Hindi-speaking skills as she was a Parsi. Shammi immediately told a worried Sheikh that she would be talking with him in Hindi and that he should point out any flaw if he was able to find any. Sheikh Mukhtar was impressed with her. The next day, she was called to Mahalaxmi studios for her screen test. She was advised by director Tara Harish to change her name to "Shammi" as there was another actress named Nargis in the industry. Her monthly salary was Rs 500. She was asked to sign a three-year contract with a condition that she couldn't work outside without their permission. She was just 18 when she signed for her first film, Ustad Pedro, in January 1949. Ustad Pedro had Sheikh Mukhtar opposite Begum Para and Mukri as the comedian and it was directed by Tara Harish and this Begum Para-Sheikh Mukhtar starrer was a hit film at the box office in 1949.

She had to attend the studio every day and practice acting even when she had no shoot. Shammi had to read dialogues of other films and Harish, the film's director taught her a lot of things since he was an actor himself. Harish was directing another film produced by Mukesh, called Malhar. Shammi was given the main lead in that film. Since the director was the same, Shammi was allowed to work outside the Sheikh Mukthar banner. She got good reviews for Malhar. The movie's music was also a hit. 'Malhar' made Shammi a star. Shammi was financially stable now, so they shifted to Bandra. During the shooting of Malhar, she met Nargis Dutt through the latter's mother Jaddan bai. They became good friends. Nargis was one of her best friends and later, because of their friendship she got a supporting role in the film Miss India. She quoted in an interview "Nargis was the first actor to be paid Rs 1 lakh; even Dilip Kumar did not get that kind of money then. It was the talk of the industry. Actors like me who did supporting roles would get anything around Rs 10,000 to Rs 15,000."

Her third film with Dilip Kumar and Madhubala, called Sangdil. The movie was released late in 1952 and was only a moderate success. Since Sangdil was unpopular with audience, she did not get work for seven months. Shammi started off by playing the main lead or second lead in films, but after Sangdil, she had to accept whatever work came to her. She acted as a vamp in few such films. She quoted in an interview: "Many people scolded me when I did that but I was clear in my mind that I had to work. Sitting at home would not help me since I was the breadwinner of the family." She got roles as the leading heroine opposite heroes such as Mahipal, Manhar Desai and Karan Dewan. After release of K. Asif's hit film Musafirkhana, she was flooded with similar roles. Her role opposite comedian Johnny Walker was appreciated in this film.

Some of her successful movies as supporting actress in this period were  Ilzam (1954), Pehli Jhalak (1955), Bandish (1955), Azaad (1955), Halaku (1956), Son of Sinbad (1955), Raj Tilak (1958), Khazanchi (1958), Ghar Sansar (1958), Aakhiri Dao (1958), Kangan (1959), Bhai-Bahen (1959) and Dil Apna Aur Preet Parai (1960). The rest of her films released from 1952 to 1960 were deemed as commercial failures. In the period 1962 to 1970, her comedy and vamp roles made an impact in successful films such as Half Ticket, Ishaara, Jab Jab Phool Khile, Preet Na Jane Reet, Aamne - Saamne, Upkar, Ittefaq, Sajan, Doli, Raja Saab and The Train.

In the early 1970s, she started being offered character roles, mostly playing mothers, in movies like Purab Aur Paschim and Adhikar. She won the BFJA Award as Best Supporting Actress for Samaj Ko Badal Dalo (1971). She married an aspiring director named Sultan Ahmed. He used Shammi's connections in the industry to get work. Her friends like Rajesh Khanna, Sunil Dutt and Asha Parekh worked in films directed by Sultan Ahmed. Her husband's directorial ventures such as Heera (1973), Dharam Kanta, and Daata were successful. During this period, Shammi did not accept offers from other directors and due to this she started getting fewer offers to act in films. In hindsight, she admitted that that had been a mistake on her part.

Shammi suffered two miscarriages and there were no further pregnancies. So, she and Sultan Ahmed did not have any children. This created tension in their relationship. The couple had bought a house and her husband wanted to put the house in her name. Shammi was of the opinion that since her sister-in law did not have an income, Ahmed should put the house in his sister's name. Ahmed's brother in law's family also resided with them. Shammi was close to her brother-in-law's children and took care of them. After seven years of marriage, she separated from her husband in 1980. She walked out of the house without taking anything with her, including her car. She returned to her old house where she stayed with her mother in Bandra. Nargis Dutt helped Shammi get a role in The Burning Train within eight days after Shammi had left her house. Her friend Rajesh Khanna helped her get small roles in films with him in the lead from 1980 such as Red Rose (film), Aanchal, Kudrat, Awara Baap and Swarg. These films got her noticed as a supporting actress and revived her career.

Encouraged by her recent successes, she decided to produce a film named Pighalta Aasman in 1985. Rajesh Khanna was going to act in the film, and he suggested the name of (Esmayeel Shroff) as the director. There was reportedly an altercation between Esmayeel and Khanna, after which Khanna walked out of the film. It had not gone on the floors then. Shammi had brought in a big actress, Raakhee, as Rajesh Khanna was starring in the film. The distributors were dissatisfied with Shammi as she had promised them Rajesh Khanna. She then approached Shashi Kapoor. On this topic, she quoted in an interview: "He (Shashi Kapoor) did not even ask me how much I was going to pay him. Everything fell in place. But the director sucked the life out of me. He fought with everyone on the sets. Ultimately, he was thrown out of the film before the dubbing was completed. I directed the film. The film bombed at the box office. I knew it would flop. I went into a big loss."

To help her recover from the losses, Rajesh Khanna, who was producing television series then, helped Shammi get a few roles on TV shows. She was getting paid well for her roles in both movies and TV shows, and this time she started saving money. Her performances in serials such as Dekh Bhai Dekh, Zabaan Sambhal Ke, Shriman Shrimati, Kabhi Yeh Kabhi Woh and Filmi Chakkar were appreciated. She was very much in demand from 1990 to 2000, appearing in many successful films such as Coolie No 1, Hum, Mardon Wali Baat, Gurudev, Gopi Kishan, Hum Saath-Saath Hain and Imtihaan. Her portrayal of the role of a drug addict in Mahesh Bhatt's Lahu Ke Do Rang got her good reviews. Movie offers, however, stopped coming to her after 2002 since she was getting older. She was rarely offered any roles from 2008 to 2011.

She made a comeback with Shirin Farhad Ki Toh Nikal Padi in 2013; as the director Bela Sehgal wanted her for the role of a Parsi woman.

Personal life
Shammi was married to film producer & director Sultan Ahmed for seven years, before they were divorced.

Death 
Shammi died in her sleep on 6 March 2018, aged 88.

Filmography

Television

References

External links 
 
 

1929 births
2018 deaths
Indian film actresses
Indian television actresses
Actresses from Mumbai
Parsi people from Mumbai
Actresses in Hindi cinema
20th-century Indian actresses
21st-century Indian actresses